Matthew Brian Othick (born March 18, 1969) is a retired American professional basketball player, independent film producer, and restaurateur.

Biography
Born in Clovis, New Mexico, Othick played basketball at Bishop Gorman high school in Las Vegas, NV where he was named two-time Nevada state player of the year 1987,1988. He played his college ball at the University of Arizona from 1989 to 1992. He is one of a small group of Arizona players to score over 1000 points and dish out 500 plus assists in his career. He went on to play  with the NBA's San Antonio Spurs in 1992. A 6'2" (1.88 m) 175 lb (75 kg) point guard, he continued his pro basketball career with the Omaha Racers 1992-1993, Fargo Fever 1994-1996 and Yakima Sun Kings in the CBA1998.

In 2006, Othick was part of group developing a film based on the life of his former high school and college teammate, the late Bison Dele (then known as Brian Williams), who presumably died during a boat trip in 2002. With his brother, Trent, Othick helped finance the Magnolia Pictures film Yonkers Joe, on which he is listed as an executive producer.

As of 2008, Othick is a Las Vegas and Del Mar, California-based land broker/investor.

Othick opened Crust Pizzeria in Carlsbad, California in 2011. He went on to open and operate two more locations, one in San Diego, California in 2014 and his latest in Solana Beach, California in 2018.

Notes

External links
NBA stats @ basketballreference.com

1969 births
Living people
American men's basketball players
Arizona Wildcats men's basketball players
Basketball players from New Mexico
Bishop Gorman High School alumni
Fargo-Moorhead Fever players
Omaha Racers players
People from Clovis, New Mexico
Point guards
San Antonio Spurs players
Undrafted National Basketball Association players
Yakima Sun Kings players